Cleon (Kleon) was a tyrant of the ancient Greek city-state of Sicyon.  According to Plutarch, he was assassinated and Timocleidas and Cleinias were made chief magistrates. According to Pausanias, Cleon was succeeded by Euthydemus and Timocleidas who ruled jointly as tyrants.

References

3rd-century BC Greek people
Ancient Sicyonians
Ancient Greek tyrants